An army aviation unit is an aviation-related unit of a nation's army, sometimes described as an air corps. These units are generally separate from a nation's dedicated air force, and usually comprise helicopters and light support fixed-wing aircraft. Prior to the establishment of separate national air forces, many armies had military aviation units, which as the importance of aviation increased, were spun off into independent services. As the separation between a nation's army and air force led to a divergence of priorities, many armies sought to re-establish their own aviation branches to best serve their own organic tactical needs.

History

Military aviation first began as either army or naval aviation units established as force multipliers to allow armies and navies to better do what they were already doing, this taking mostly the form of reconnaissance and artillery spotting, this led to the first fighter aircraft whose purpose was to shoot down enemy reconnaissance and artillery spotting aircraft, and to protect one's own aircraft from being shot down. At this point the purpose of aircraft was still to act as an adjunct to traditional armies and fleets operating in the traditional way. However, as aircraft became more technologically sophisticated military theorists of the interwar period began to think of airpower as a means in and of itself where the critical blow could be delivered by strategic bombing, and the experience of World War II confirmed this. Post World War II air forces such as the Royal Air Force and the newly established United States Air Force concentrated on building strategic bomber forces for attack and fighter forces to defend against enemy bombers. Air forces still incorporated a significant amount of tactical missions through air interdiction and close air support missions.

In order to acquire a close air support capability armies sought to expand, establish or re-establish their own tactical aviation branches, which are usually composed of helicopters, rather than fixed-wing aircraft.

With the development of unmanned aerial vehicles some armies have begun to use small battlefield UAVs, not attached to army aviation units, but rather directly attached to artillery battalions as spotters, and with the smallest and lightest drones being deployed by individual infantry platoons to provide real time local reconnaissance.

Tasks

The tasks of each army's aviation units are defined slightly different, depending on country. Some general characteristics include:

Tactical offensive action (anti-tank warfare, air assault, and close air support)
ISTAR (Intelligence, Surveillance, Target acquisition, Reconnaissance)
 Logistic and battlefield support
 Tactical transport both internally and externally, of personnel and material
 Search and rescue
 Medical evacuation
 Liaison
 Disaster relief

Equipment 

In order to fulfill their manifold tasks, army aviation mostly uses helicopters. These helicopters can be classified into the following categories:

Attack helicopters for close air support of ground troops and anti-tank role
Transport helicopters
Observation helicopters
Utility helicopters
Combat Search and Rescue (CSAR), Casualty evacuation (CASEVAC) / Medical evacuation (MEDEVAC) helicopters
Training helicopters

In addition to helicopters, some armies also operate fixed-wing aircraft for tactical reconnaissance.

List of army aviation units

 Argentine Army Aviation (Argentine Army)
 Army Air Corps (United Kingdom) (British Army)
 Army Aviation Corps (India) (Indian Army)
 Australian Army Aviation (Australian Army)
 Bangladesh Army Aviation Group (Bangladesh Army)
 Brazilian Army Aviation Command (Brazilian Army)
 Colombian National Army Aviation (Colombian Army)
 French Army Light Aviation (French Army)
 German Army Aviation Corps (German Army)
 Hellenic Army Aviation (Hellenic Army)
 Indonesian Army Aviation (Indonesian Army)
 Islamic Republic of Iran Army Aviation (Islamic Republic of Iran Army) 
Islamic Revolutionary Guard Corps Aviation (IR.SA)
 Iraqi Army Aviation Command (Iraqi Army) 
 Malaysian Army Aviation (Malaysian Army)
 Nepalese Army Air Service (Nepali Army)
 Pakistan Army Aviation Corps (Pakistan Army)
 Portuguese Army Light Aviation Unit (Portuguese Army)
 Spanish Army Airmobile Force (Spanish Army)
 Royal Thai Army Aviation Center (Royal Thai Army)
 United States Army Aviation Branch (U.S. Army)

See also

 Military aviation
 Timeline of military aviation
 Naval aviation

References

Further reading

External links